Mayhem is a compilation album by the English new wave band Toyah, fronted by Toyah Willcox, released in 1985 by Safari Records.

Background
The album is a collection of previously unreleased material consisting mostly of demos and outtakes. When the band left Safari Records, the record company found enough material to compile one last album; this was apparently done without the consent of the band members. "We were never asked at the time by Safari if we'd be happy for certain demos to go on that album. (...) Of all the albums I wish had not been released, Mayhem is the one. It's sub-standard, with songs not intended for release. In fact, it makes my blood boil when I think of the plain exploitation of this album, but hopefully it never sold many copies. The songs on it were rehearsal demos, never intended for anything other than workshopping ideas", Toyah commented later.

The cassette version of Mayhem included three additional tracks. The album was reissued on CD by Cherry Red Records in 2005 and featured a further five previously unreleased bonus tracks. This new edition came with a recreated cover art, using better quality photos, and track-by-track sleeve notes.

Track listing

 Line-up unconfirmed on †
 Line-up unconfirmed except for Bogen and Hale on *

Personnel
 Toyah Willcox – vocals
 Joel Bogen – guitar except † and ‡
 Phil Spalding – bass on 1, 5, 7, 10, 19
 Adrian Lee – keyboards on 1, 5, 7, 10, 19
 Simon Phillips – drums on 1, 7, 19
 Nigel Glockler – drums on 5, 10
 Keith Hale – keyboards on 4, 6, 12, 18 and 20
 Simon Etchell – keyboards on 18 and 20
 Gordon Coxon – drums on 6, 18 and 20
 Rikki Legair – bass on 6
 Mark Henry – bass on 8, 9, 13, 14, 16, 17
 Steve Bray – drums on 8, 9, 13, 14, 16, 17
 Pete Bush – keyboards on 8, 9, 13, 14, 16, 17

References

External links
 Official audio stream on YouTube
 The official Toyah website

Toyah (band) albums
1985 compilation albums
Albums produced by Steve Lillywhite